Iceland earthquake may refer to:

2008 Iceland earthquake
2000 Iceland earthquakes, a doublet on June 17 and 21

See also
List of earthquakes in Iceland